The Ervipiame or Hierbipiame were a Native people of modern Coahuila and Texas.

Beginning in the 16th century Spanish settlement in what is today Northern Mexico and the accompanying diseases and slave raiding to supply ranches and mines with Native American labor had disruptive effects upon the inhabitants of region, by the 17th century clearly disrupting the lower Rio Grande Valley.  The Erviapiame lived primarily on the western or southern side of the Rio Grande in what is today Coahuila, primarily to the south of modern Guerrero, Coahuila.  Some of them entered Mission San Juan Bautista and Mission San Francisco Vizzaron when these missions were founded about 1700.

Later the Ervipiame were one of several people that lived in the Rancheria Grande along the Brazos River in what is today eastern Texas.  They lived there by the 1710s.  By 1719 they were led by a man named El Cuilón who the Spanish tried to set up as the leader of the Rancheria Grande.

In 1722 El Cuilón lead a group of Rancheria Grande residents, many of them Erviiapame, westward to settle at Mission San Francisco Xavier de Najera.  Later in the 1720s some of the Erviapame moved to Mission San Antonio de Valero.  However they often only stayed there a short time and many of them were classed as "runaways" by the Spanish.  Mariano Francisco de los Dolores y Viana starting before 1735 made annual trips to the Rancheria Grande and tried to get the Ervipiame and other groups there to move to the missions around San Antonio.

Although many Ervipiame had fled the San Antonio missions they did see some advantages to the mission system and in 1745 sent a delegation along with the Yojuanes, Deadoses and other residents of the Rancheria Grande to ask that a mission be built along the Brazos.

In 1747 some of the Ervipiame moved to Mission San Francisco Xavier de Horcasitas on the San Gabriel River,

Sources

Native American tribes in Texas